The 2022–23 Scottish Cup is the 138th season of Scotland's most prestigious football knockout competition.

The defending champions are Rangers, who beat Heart of Midlothian in the 2022 Scottish Cup Final. VAR will be used for the first time in the tournament.

Calendar
The calendar for the 2022–23 Scottish Cup was announced by the Scottish Football Association on 29 July 2022. Starting this season, replays were abolished after the preliminary round. From the first round, matches tied after 90 minutes will go to extra time, and if still tied, to penalty kicks.

Preliminary round
The preliminary round took place on the weekend of 27 August 2022. In total, 50 clubs entered the competition at this stage. They were drawn into 24 ties, with two clubs receiving a bye to the first round.

Benburb, Bonnyton Thistle, Kilwinning Rangers, Rutherglen Glencairn, St Andrews United, Syngenta, and Tayport are taking part for the first time, along with Lochee United and Pollok who were qualifiers in previous seasons, having each gained their Club Licence.

Carnoustie Panmure (Midlands League champions), Drumchapel United (East, South and West of Scotland Cup-Winners Shield winners), Invergordon (North Caledonian League champions), and Tower Hearts (Amateur Cup winners) have also qualified to take part in the competition for the first time.

Draw
The draw for the preliminary round was made on 2 August 2022. Two clubs, except the four qualifiers (Carnoustie Panmure, Drumchapel United, Invergordon, or Tower Hearts), were eligible to receive a bye to the first round.
Teams in bold advanced to the first round.

Jeanfield Swifts and Tynecastle received a bye to the first round.

Matches

Replays

First round
The first round took place on the weekend of 17 September 2022. Along with the 26 teams advancing from the preliminary round, there were 34 new entries at this stage - 18 from the Highland Football League and 16 from the Lowland Football League. The draw for the first round was made on 29 August 2022 at 15:00.

Teams in bold advanced to the second round.

Pollok's match against Huntly on 16 September 2022 was originally to be aired on BBC Scotland but the broadcaster pulled out citing an "exceptional demand" on their resources following the death of Elizabeth II.

Matches

Notes

Second round
The second round took place on the weekend of 22 October 2022. Along with the 30 winners from the first round, there were 10 new entries at this stage - all from League Two. The draw for the second round was made on 18 September 2022 at 18:00, live on the Scottish Cup YouTube, Facebook and Twitter pages.

Teams in bold advanced to the third round.

Matches

Third round
The third round took place on the weekend of 26 November 2022. Along with the 20 winners from the second round, there were 20 new entries at this stage - all from League One and the Championship. The draw for the third round was made on 24 October 2022 at 16:00, live on the Scottish Cup YouTube, Facebook and Twitter pages.

Teams in Italics were unknown at the time of the draw. Teams in bold advanced to the fourth round. 

Dunipace were drawn against Championship club Cove Rangers (65 places above them), representing the biggest league position gap between two teams in the competition's history since the pyramid system was introduced. Drumchapel United's win over FC Edinburgh from League One (61 places above them) was also a record for the biggest league position gap for a lower ranked winning club.

Matches

Fourth round
The fourth round took place on the weekend of 21 January 2023. Along with the 20 winners from the third round, there are 12 new entries at this stage - all from the Premiership. The draw for the fourth round was made on 28 November 2022 following the Ayr United v Pollok match, live on BBC Scotland.

Teams in bold advanced to the fifth round. Queen's Park won 2–0 at Inverness in their fourth round match, but were expelled from the competition because they fielded an ineligible player.

Matches

Notes

B- Queen's Park fielded an ineligible player in their fourth round match against Inverness Caledonian Thistle and were removed from the competition. The match had originally finished 2–0 to Queen's Park.

Fifth round
The fifth round took place on the weekend of 11 February 2023. The draw was made on 22 January 2023 and broadcast live across the Scottish Cup social channels.

Teams in Italics were unknown at the time of the draw.

Teams in bold advanced to the quarter-finals.

Matches

Quarter-finals
The quarter-finals took place on the weekend of 11 March 2023. The draw was made on 13 February 2023 and broadcast live across the Scottish Cup social channels.

Teams in Italics were unknown at the time of the draw.

Teams in bold advanced to the semi-finals.

Matches

Semi-finals
The semi-finals will take place on the weekend of 29 April 2023. The draw was made on 13 March 2023, following the Falkirk v Ayr United match live on BBC Scotland.

Matches

Broadcasting
The Scottish Cup is broadcast by Viaplay Sports and BBC Scotland. Viaplay Sports has the first two picks of the fourth and fifth rounds, the quarter-finals as well as first pick of one semi-final and  airs the final non-exclusively. BBC Scotland broadcast one match per round from the first round onwards and two matches per round from the fourth round to the quarter-finals, as well as one semi-final and the final.

The following matches were selected for live coverage on UK television:

References

2022–23 in Scottish football cups
Current association football seasons
2022-23
2022–23 European domestic association football cups